Flight of the Wounded Locust is a 7-inch EP by American noise rock band The Locust. It was released in 2001 on Gold Standard Laboratories. Flight of the Wounded Locust was also the band's final recording as a five-piece (after which drummer David Astor left and was replaced by then-guitarist Gabe Serbian).

The EP was released on 7-inch clear vinyl, CD, and as a limited edition box set with four 7-inch records, all shaped like puzzle pieces and colored differently. The CD and 4×7″ versions of the EP contain five bonus tracks released on a split 7-inch with Arab on Radar.

Track listing
"Gluing Carpet to Your Genitals Does Not Make You a Cantaloupe" – 0:50
"Turning Your Merchandise into a Ripped Wall of Mini-Abs" – 0:37
"Bring Your 6.5 Italian Carbine" – 0:43
"Alas, Here Come the Hypochondriacs to Wait With You in the Lobby" – 0:43
"Siphoning Projectiles During Selective Amnesia" – 1:06
"Get Off the Cross, the Wood Is Needed" – 0:42
"Wet Nurse Syndrome Hand-Me-Down Display Case" – 0:34
"This Is Radio Surgery" – 0:41
"Spitting in the Faces of Fools as a Source of Nutrition" – 0:45
"Sever the Toes" – 0:52
"Flight of the Wounded Locust" – 2:36

Personnel
Justin Pearson – vocals, bass guitar
Gabe Serbian – guitar
Joey Karam – keyboards, vocals
Bobby Bray – guitar, vocals
David Astor – drums

References

The Locust albums
2001 EPs
Gold Standard Laboratories EPs